is the first live album by Japanese rock band, Asian Kung-Fu Generation and was released on September 11, 2013. They recorded it when they performed in NHK BS's special program, "The Recording Asian Kung-Fu Generation" on April 27, 2013 and Masafumi Gotō announced it as live album on Twitter. This is the first time the band didn't use Yusuke Nakamura's artwork on their work, instead they just used a picture of the recording.

Track listing

CD

DVD

Personnel 
 Masafumi Gotō – vocals, guitar,
 Kensuke Kita – guitar, vocals
 Takahiro Yamada – bass, vocals
 Kiyoshi Ijichi – drums

Charts

References 

Asian Kung-Fu Generation albums
2013 live albums
Japanese-language albums
Sony Music albums